The French Open is an annual badminton tournament held in France since 1909 and hosted by the Fédération Française de Badminton (FFBad).

The tournament was halted between 1915 and 1934, in 1965, 1970, 1972, 1994 and 2006. Not previously considered one of the international badminton circuit's leading events, it was promoted to become part of the BWF Super Series in 2007 making the French Open one of the 12 major badminton tournaments in the world. BWF categorised French Open as one of the five BWF World Tour Super 750 events per the BWF events structure since 2018.

Past winners

Performances by nation

References

External links

 

 
Badminton tournaments in France
1909 establishments in France
Recurring sporting events established in 1909